Bibaj is a village in the municipality of Mavrovo and Rostuša, North Macedonia.

Demographics
As of the 2021 census, Bibaj had zero residents.

According to the 2002 census, the village had a total of 31 inhabitants. Ethnic groups in the village include:
Albanians 31

References

Villages in Mavrovo and Rostuša Municipality
Albanian communities in North Macedonia